Craig Mahoney was the current Vice-Chancellor of the University of West of Scotland until the end of 2021, and then spent six months as Vice-Chancellor of the University of Law. He is a chartered psychologist and academic.

Education 
Mahoney holds bachelor's degree in Chemistry and Mathematics from the University of Tasmania, master's degree from the University of Birmingham, and Doctor of philosophy from Queen University Belfast.

Career 
Mahoney was the vice Chancellor of the University of Tasmania. He was the deputy Vice Chancellor at Northumbria University, a dean of the school of sport, performing arts and leisure at Wolverhampton University. He was the chief executive of the higher education academy. He is chartered psychologist and an associate fellow of the British Psychological society.

References 

Living people
Year of birth missing (living people)
British psychologists